North Walsall railway station was a station built by the Wolverhampton and Walsall Railway in 1872, and was operated by the Midland Railway from 1876 onwards. It served the north Walsall areas of Birchills and Leamore. It was located west of Bloxwich Road in a cutting.

The station closed in 1925, although the railway serving it remained open for a further 57 years, serving Birchills Power Station until its closure in October 1982, when the line closed.

Station site today

Due to decades of litter and fly tipping. A proposal was submitted to Walsall Council to fill in the cutting between Walsall and to the north of North Walsall (Near the present day Reedswood Retail Park).

Centro confirmed the plan and in late 2015/early 2016. Work began to fill in the cutting and remove a pedestrian overpass nearby. The site is now filled in with dirt and a very small section fenced off on both ends is used by walkers to cross over to the two nearby housing estates on both ends of the former trackbed. No evidence remains of the former North Walsall station other than the road bridges and the trackbed towards Bentley.

See also 
 List of closed railway stations in Britain

References

Disused railway stations in Walsall
Railway stations in Great Britain opened in 1872
Railway stations in Great Britain closed in 1925
Former Midland Railway stations